The following lists events that happened during 1925 in New Zealand.

Incumbents

Regal and viceregal
 Head of State – George V
 Governor-General – Sir Charles Fergusson

Government
The 21st New Zealand Parliament concludes, with its final year marked by the death of premier William Massey. The Reform Party governs as a minority with the support of independents. Following the general election in November, the Reform Party holds a much stronger position with 55 of the 80 seats.
 Speaker of the House – Charles Statham
 Prime Minister – William Massey until 10 May, then Francis Bell from 14 to 30 May, then Gordon Coates
 Minister of Finance – William Massey until 10 May, then William Nosworthy from 14 May
 Minister of External Affairs – Francis Bell

Parliamentary opposition
 Leader of the Opposition – Thomas Wilford (Liberal Party) until 13 August, then George Forbes (Liberal) until 4 November, then vacant (until June 1926)

Judiciary
 Chief Justice – Sir Robert Stout

Main centre leaders
 Mayor of Auckland – James Gunson, succeeded by George Baildon
 Mayor of Wellington – Robert Wright, succeeded by Charles Norwood
 Mayor of Christchurch – James Flesher, succeeded by John Archer
 Mayor of Dunedin – Harold Tapley

Events 

 1 January
 National scheme for vehicle registration plates comes into force
 Ernest Rutherford is appointed to the Order of Merit
 21 April – Alfred Averill succeeds Churchill Julius as Archbishop of New Zealand
 10 May – Prime Minister William Massey dies in office
 31 May – Tahupotiki Wiremu Rātana announces his intention to form the Rātana Church
 17 June – The Franklin by-election, caused by the death of William Massey, is won by Ewen McLennan (Reform)
 August – The U.S. Navy's Pacific battlefleet of 57 vessels including 12 battleships visits New Zealand during a goodwill tour of the South Pacific after manoeuvres off Hawaii.
 3–4 November – The 1925 general election is held, with the Reform Party winning 55 of the 80 seats in the House of Representatives
 4 November – An Order in Council provides for the transfer of Tokelau from the Gilbert and Ellice Islands colony to New Zealand (formally gazetted 11 February 1926)
 17 November – The New Zealand and South Seas International Exhibition opens at Logan Park, Dunedin
 Undated – Lloyd Mandeno develops the single-wire earth return electrical distribution system

Arts and literature
See: 1925 in art, 1925 in literature, 
 Allen Adair published by Jane Mander

Music
See: 1925 in music

Radio
See: Public broadcasting in New Zealand
 The Radio Broadcasting Company (RBC) began broadcasts throughout New Zealand

Film
See: 1925 in film, List of New Zealand feature films, Cinema of New Zealand, :Category:1925 films
 Rewi's Last Stand by Rudall Hayward
 The Adventures of Algy
 The Romance of Hinemoa

Sport

Chess
 The 34th National Chess Championship is held in Nelson, and is won by C. J. S. Purdy of Sydney

Football
 The Chatham Cup is won by YMCA (Wellington)
 Provincial league champions:
 Auckland – Thistle
 Canterbury – Sunnyside
 Hawke's Bay – Whakatu
 Nelson – Thistle
 Otago – Northern
 South Canterbury – Rangers
 Southland – Central
 Taranaki –  Manaia
 Wanganui – Eastown Workshops
 Wellington – YMCA

Golf
 The 15th New Zealand Open championship is won by Ewen MacFarlane, an amateur, with an aggregate of 308
 The 29th National Amateur Championships are held at Christchurch (men) and Miramar (women)
 Men – Tom Horton (Masterton)
 Women – Phyllis Dodgshun (Dunedin)

Horse racing

Harness racing
 New Zealand Trotting Cup – Ahuriri
 Auckland Trotting Cup – Nelson Derby

Thoroughbred racing
 New Zealand Cup – The Banker
 Avondale Gold Cup – Star Ranger
 Auckland Cup – Rapine
 Wellington Cup – Surveyor
 New Zealand Derby – Runnymede

Lawn bowls
The national outdoor lawn bowls championships are held in Wellington.
 Men's singles champion – J. D. Best (Dunedin Bowling Club)
 Men's pair champions – C. W. Davis, J. W. Sexton (skip) (Newtown Bowling Club)
 Men's fours champions – H. J. Wernham, F. T. Wilson, A. C. McIntyre, R. N. Pilkington (skip) (Hamilton Bowling Club)

Rugby union
 The All Blacks tour New South Wales
 The Auckland Rugby Union makes Eden Park its headquarters

Births

January
 4 January – Roger Drayton, politician
 12 January – Allan Burnett, anarchist activist
 13 January – Elwyn Welch, ornithologist
 22 January – Harata Solomon, Māori leader, entertainer
 25 January – Eric Dempster, cricketer
 26 January – Barbara Heslop, immunologist

February
 1 February – Assid Corban, politician
 2 February – Mirek Smíšek, potter
 3 February – Tay Wilson, sports administrator
 7 February
 Ron Broom, cricketer
 John Oakley, cricketer
 19 February – Trevor Martin, cricket umpire
 22 February – Alexander Grant, ballet dancer and teacher, dance company director
 23 February
 Fraser Colman, politician
 Ted McCoy, architect
 25 February – Campbell Smith, playwright, poet, engraver
 27 February – Joan Hastings, swimmer

March
 8 March – Leonard Mitchell, artist
 9 March
 Johnny Borland, high jumper, athletics administrator
 Aubrey Ritchie, cricketer
 13 March
 John McCraw, pedologist, local historian
 Rahera Windsor, Māori leader in the United Kingdom
 21 March – John Heslop, surgeon, cricket administrator
 25 March – O. E. Middleton, writer

April
 4 April – Harvey Kreyl, rugby league player
 5 April – Milan Mrkusich, artist
 17 April – Vern Clare, musician, cabaret owner
 19 April
 Eva Rickard, Māori leader and activist
 Maurie Robertson, rugby league player and coach
 23 April – Al Hobman, professional wrestler, trainer and promoter
 24 April – Dorothy Butler, children's author and bookseller, memoirist, reading advocate
 25 April – Neville Black, rugby union and rugby league player
 28 April – David Brokenshire, architect, potter

May
 2 May – Frances Porter, writer, historian
 14 May
 Gordon Gostelow, actor
 W. H. Oliver, poet, historian
 16 May – John Ziman, physicist, humanist
 20 May
 Maurice Crow, weightlifter, rowing coxswain
 Bert Potter, commune leader
 27 May – Arthur Campbell, chemist

June
 3 June – Trevor Barber, cricketer
 11 June – Tiny White, rugby union player and administrator, politician
 25 June – Alistair Campbell, poet, playwright, novelist
 27 June – Ben Couch, rugby union player, politician
 29 June – Doody Townley, harness-racing driver

July
 2 July – Philip Liner, radio broadcaster
 8 July – Elwyn Richardson, educationalist
 9 July – Rex Bergstrom, econometrician
 10 July – Dixie Cockerton, netball player and coach, cricketer, school principal
 15 July – Stuart Jones, golfer
 16 July – J. B. Trapp, historian
 18 July – Allan Elsom, rugby union player
 20 July – Eric Watson, cricketer
 26 July – Alister Atkinson, rugby league player
 31 July
 John O'Brien, politician
 Helen Ryburn, school principal, local-body politician

August
 3 August – John Robertson, public servant
 5 August – Bob Duff, rugby union player, local-body politician
 13 August – Peter Beaven, architect
 15 August – James Brown, public servant
 23 August – John Armitt, amateur wrestler
 28 August – Trevor Young, politician
 30 August – Joan Hart, athlete

September
 1 September – Te Aue Davis, tohunga raranga
 4 September
 Phil Amos, politician
 Bruce Stewart, television scriptwriter
 19 September – Lyn Forster, arachnologist

October
 7 October
 Bryan Drake, opera singer
 Bill Wolfgramm, musician
 9 October – Bill Schaefer, field hockey player
 19 October – David Gould, rower, businessman
 21 October – Ian Ballinger, sports shooter
 22 October – George Grindley, geologist
 23 October – Brian Nordgren, rugby league player
 25 October – Donald Brian, cricketer
 30 October
 Audrey Eagle, botanical illustrator
 Colin Kay, athlete, politician
 31 October – Ngaire Lane, swimmer

November
 6 November – Ian Cross, novelist, journalist, broadcasting and arts administrator
 12 November – Bill Toomath, architect
 20 November – Bill Subritzky, property developer, evangelist
 23 November – Tui Flower, food writer
 26 November – Ross Taylor, geochemist, planetary scientist
 27 November – Reginald Johansson, field hockey player
 29 November – Peter Jacobson, poet

December
 1 December
 Noeline Gourley, field hockey player, athlete, woodturner
 Thomas Thorp, jurist
 5 December – Jack Tynan, field hockey player, cricketer
 10 December – Betty Maker, cricketer
 23 December – Ellis Child, cricketer
 31 December – Ray Bell, rugby union player

Exact date unknown
 Nightmarch, Thoroughbred racehorse

Deaths

January–March
 3 January – John Endean, gold miner, hotel proprietor (born 1844)
 11 January – Oliver Samuel, politician (born 1849)
 13 February – Margaret McKenzie, pioneer (born 1839)

April–June
 14 April – Don Hamilton, rugby union player, cricketer (born 1883)
 27 April – George Williams, rugby union player (born 1856)
 10 May – William Massey, politician, Prime Minister of New Zealand (1912–1925) (born 1856)
 15 May – Stephen Boreham, trade unionist (born 1857)
 18 May – Sir Theophilus Cooper, jurist (born 1850)
 19 May
 Andrew Cameron, Presbyterian minister, educationalist, community leader (born 1855)
 Frances Wimperis, artist (born 1840)
 21 May – Samuel Kirkpatrick, businessman (born 1854)
 3 June – Frank Surman, rugby union player, athlete (born 1866)

July–September
 18 July – John Sinclair, carpenter, builder, harbourmaster (born 1843)
 19 July – James Cox, diarist (born 1846)
 22 July – William McCullough, politician (born 1843)
 5 August – Emily Harris, painter (born 1837)
 9 August – Catherine Adamson, diarist (born 1868)
 1 September – Donald Petrie, botanist (born 1846)
 19 August – Harriet Morison, trade unionist, suffragist, public servant (born 1862)
 15 September – Charles Melvill, military leader (born 1878)
 18 September – Charles Hayward Izard, politician (born 1862)
 19 September – Henry Reynolds, butter manufacturer and exporter (born 1849)
 27 September – Thomas MacGibbon, politician (born 1839)

October–December
 2 October – Thomas Hislop, politician (born 1850)
 20 November – Charles Mackesy, military leader (born 1861)
 28 November – William Joseph Napier, politician (born 1857)
 10 December – John Liddell Kelly, journalist, poet (born 1850)
 29 December – John Crewes, Bible Christian minister, social worker, journalist (born 1847)

See also
 History of New Zealand
 List of years in New Zealand
 Military history of New Zealand
 Timeline of New Zealand history
 Timeline of New Zealand's links with Antarctica
 Timeline of the New Zealand environment

References

External links

 
Years of the 20th century in New Zealand